The Milice Française (French Militia), generally called la Milice (literally the militia), was a political paramilitary organization created on 30 January 1943 by the Vichy regime (with German aid) to help fight against the French Resistance during World War II. The Milice's formal head was Prime Minister Pierre Laval, although its Chief of operations and de facto leader was Secretary General Joseph Darnand. It participated in summary executions and assassinations, helping to round up Jews and résistants in France for deportation. It was the successor to Darnand's Service d'ordre légionnaire (SOL) militia. The Milice was the Vichy regime's most extreme manifestation of fascism. Ultimately, Darnand envisaged the Milice as a fascist single party political movement for the French state.

The Milice frequently used torture to extract information or confessions from those whom they interrogated. The French Resistance considered the Milice more dangerous than the Gestapo and SS because they were native Frenchmen who understood local dialects fluently, had extensive knowledge of the towns and countryside, and knew local people and informants.

Membership

Early Milice volunteers included members of France's pre-war far-right parties, such as the Action Française, and working-class men convinced of the benefits of the Vichy government's politics. In addition to ideology, incentives for joining the Milice included employment, regular pay and rations, the latter of which became particularly important as the war continued and civilian rations dwindled to near-starvation levels. Some joined because members of their families had been killed or injured in Allied bombing raids or had been threatened, extorted or attacked by French Resistance groups. Still others joined for more mundane reasons: petty criminals were recruited by being told their sentences would be commuted if they joined the organization, and Milice volunteers were exempt from transportation to Germany as forced labour. Official figures are difficult to obtain, but several historians including Julian T. Jackson estimate that the Milice's membership reached 25,000–30,000 by 1944. The majority of members were not full-time militiamen, but devoted only a few hours per week to their Milice activities. The Milice had a section for full-time members, the Franc-Garde, who were permanently mobilized and lived in barracks.

The Milice also had youth sections for boys and girls, called the Avant-Garde.

Symbols and materials

Emblem

The chosen emblem for the Milice carried the Greek letter γ (gamma), the symbol of the Aries astrological sign in the Zodiac, ostensibly representing rejuvenation, and replenishment of energy. The color scheme chosen was silver  in blue background within a red circle for ordinary miliciens, white in black background for the arm-carrying militants, and white in red background for the active combatants.

March 
Their march was Le Chant des Cohortes.

Uniform 

Milice troops (known as miliciens) wore a blue uniform jacket and trousers, a brown shirt and a wide blue beret. (During active paramilitary-style operations, an Adrian helmet was used, which commonly featured the emblem, either painted on or as a badge) Its newspaper was Combats (not to be confused with the underground Resistance newspaper, Combat). The Milice's armed forces were officially known as the Franc-Garde. Contemporary photographs show the Milice armed with a variety of weapons captured from Allied forces.

Ranks

History

Beginnings 
The Resistance targeted individual  for assassination, often in public areas such as cafés and streets. By late November, Combat reported that 25  had been killed and 27 wounded in Resistance attacks.

Reprisals 
The most prominent person killed by the Resistance was Philippe Henriot, the Vichy regime's Minister of Information and Propaganda, who was known as "the French Goebbels". He was killed in his apartment in the Ministry of Information on the rue Solferino in the predawn hours of 28 June 1944 by résistants dressed as miliciens. His wife, who was in the same room, was spared. The Milice retaliated for this by killing several well-known anti-Nazi politicians and intellectuals (such as Victor Basch) and prewar conservative leader Georges Mandel.

The Milice initially operated in the former Zone libre of France under the control of the Vichy regime.  In January 1944, the radicalized Milice moved into what had been the zone occupée of France (including Paris). They established their headquarters in the old Communist Party headquarters at 44 rue Le Peletier and at 61 rue Monceau. (The house was formerly owned by the Menier family, makers of France's best-known chocolates.) The Lycée Louis-Le-Grand was occupied as a barracks, and an officer candidate school was established in the Auteuil synagogue.

Notable actions 
Perhaps the largest and best-known operation undertaken by the Milice was the Battle of Glières, its attempt in March 1944 to suppress the Resistance in the département of Haute-Savoie (in southeastern France, near the Swiss border). The Milice could not overcome the Resistance, and called in German troops to complete the operation. On Bastille Day, 14 July 1944, the Franc-Garde suppressed a revolt started by prisoners at Paris prison La Santé, killing 34 prisoners.

The legal standing of the Milice was never clarified by the Vichy government; it operated parallel to (but separate from) the Groupe mobile de réserve and other Vichy French police forces. The Milice operated outside civilian law, and its actions were not subject to judicial review or control.

End of the war in Europe 
In August 1944, as the tide of war was shifting and fearing he would be held accountable for the operations of the Milice, Marshal Philippe Pétain sought to distance himself from the organization by writing a harsh letter rebuking Darnand for the organization's "excesses." Darnand's response suggested that Pétain ought to have voiced his objections sooner.

After the Allied Liberation of France, French collaborators began fleeing the Allied advance in the west. During a period of unofficial reprisals immediately following on the German retreat, large numbers of miliciens were executed, either individually or in groups. Milice offices throughout France were ransacked, with agents often being brutally beaten and then thrown from office windows or into rivers before being taken to prison. At Le Grand-Bornand, French Forces of the Interior executed 76 captured members of the Milice on 24 August 1944.

Frenchmen from the German Navy, the National Socialist Motor Corps (NSKK), the Organisation Todt and the Milice security police became part of a new unit known as the Waffen Grenadier Brigade of the SS Charlemagne (Waffen-Grenadier-Brigade der SS Charlemagne). The unit also included some remaining personnel from the disbanded Legion of French Volunteers Against Bolshevism (LVF) and the SS-Volunteer Sturmbrigade France (SS-Freiwilligen Sturmbrigade "Frankreich"). Later in February 1945, the unit was renamed the Charlemagne Division of the Waffen-SS. At this time it had a strength of 7,340 men: 1,200 men from the LVF, 1,000 from the Sturmbrigade, 2,500 from the Milice, 2,000 from the NSKK, and 640 who were former Kriegsmarine and naval police.

Aftermath 
An unknown number of miliciens managed to escape prison or execution, either by going underground or fleeing abroad. A few were later prosecuted. The most notable of these was Paul Touvier, the former commander of the Milice in Lyon. In 1994, he was convicted of ordering the retaliatory execution of seven Jews at Rillieux-la-Pape. He died in prison two years later.

In popular culture
Since the war, the term milice has acquired a derogatory meaning in France.
The French hard rock ensemble Trust had a hit named "Police Milice", where its frontman Bernard Bonvoisin compared modern-day police officers to the Milice. 
Louis Malle's films Lacombe, Lucien and Au revoir les enfants include the Milice as part of the plot.
The 2003 drama The Statement, directed by Norman Jewison and starring Michael Caine, was adapted from the 1996 novel by the same name by Brian Moore. He shaped it from the story of Paul Touvier, a Vichy French Milice official who hid for years (often sheltered by the Catholic Church) and was indicted in 1991 for war crimes. Both he and the film character had supervised a mass murder of Jews.
 The film Female Agents, set during World War II, has a scene where two of the female agents walk past a recruitment poster for the Milice which says "Against Communism / French Militia / Secretary-General Joseph Darnand".
In the Doctor Who audio story Resistance, the Doctor and Polly have to evade the Milice in 1944.
They feature prominently in the popular French TV series Un Village Français which covers the whole period of the occupation and liberation and was broadcast in France and extensively internationally.
They are  enemies in Medal of Honor: Underground.
The Catholic priest Father Fehily from the Ross O'Carroll-Kelly series of novels is revealed to have served in the Milice as a young man, in the novel Should Have Got Off at Sydney Parade (2007).

See also

Axis
Lorenzen Group – Danish pro-German paramilitary group
Security Battalions – Greek pro-German paramilitary group
Carlingue – the French version of the Gestapo.
Special Brigades – Paramilitary sections of the Vichy Police service.
Geheime Feldpolizei – the secret military police of the Wehrmacht that worked alongside the Milice
Allies
Maquis des Glières – resistance group
Maquis du Vercors – resistance group

References

Further reading 
 Cullen, Stephen M., Stacey, Mark, (2018) World War II Vichy French Security Troops, Osprey Publishing. 
 
 
 
 
 

 

Far-right politics in France
National security institutions
Political repression in France
Defunct law enforcement agencies of France
French collaboration during World War II
Military of Vichy France
Paramilitary organizations based in France
1943 establishments in France
1944 disestablishments in France
Police misconduct in France
Political parties of the Vichy regime
Fascist organizations
Pierre Laval